Gilbertese or taetae ni Kiribati, also Kiribati (sometimes Kiribatese), is an Austronesian language spoken mainly in Kiribati. It belongs to the Micronesian branch of the Oceanic languages.

The word Kiribati, the current name of the islands, is the local adaptation of the European name "Gilberts" to Gilbertese phonology. Early European visitors, including Commodore John Byron, whose ships happened on Nikunau in 1765, had named some of the islands the Kingsmill or Kings Mill Islands or for the Northern group les îles Mulgrave in French but in 1820 they were renamed, in French, les îles Gilbert by Admiral Adam Johann von Krusenstern, after Captain Thomas Gilbert, who, along with Captain John Marshall, had passed through some of these islands in 1788.
Frequenting of the islands by Europeans, Americans and Chinese dates from whaling and oil trading from the 1820s, when no doubt Europeans learnt to speak it, as Gilbertese learnt to speak English and other languages foreign to them. 
The first ever vocabulary list of Gilbertese was published by the French Revue coloniale (1847) by an auxiliary surgeon on corvette Le Rhin in 1845. His warship took on board a drift Gilbertese of Kuria, that they found near Tabiteuea. However, it was not until Hiram Bingham II took up missionary work on Abaiang in the 1860s that the language began to take on the written form known now.

Bingham was the first to translate the Bible into Gilbertese, and wrote several hymn books, a dictionary (1908, posthumous) and commentaries in the language of the Gilbert Islands. Alphonse Colomb, a French priest in Tahiti wrote in 1888, Vocabulaire arorai (îles Gilbert) précédé de notes grammaticales d'après un manuscrit du P. Latium Levêque et le travail de Hale sur la langue Tarawa / par le P. A. C.. Father Levêque named the Gilbertese Arorai (from Arorae) when Horatio Hale called them Tarawa. This work was also based on the first known description of Gilbertese in English, published in 1846, in the volume Ethnology and Philology of the U.S. Exploring Expedition, compiled by Horatio Hale.

The official name of the language is te taetae ni Kiribati, or 'the Kiribati language', but the common name is te taetae n aomata, or 'the language of the people'.

The first complete and comprehensive description of this language was published in Dictionnaire gilbertin–français of Father  (981 pp, 1952–1954), a Catholic priest. It was later partially translated into English by Sister Olivia, with the help of the South Pacific Commission.

Speakers
Over 96% of the 119,000 people living in Kiribati declare themselves I-Kiribati and speak Gilbertese. Gilbertese is also spoken by most inhabitants of Nui (Tuvalu), Rabi Island (Fiji), and some other islands where I-Kiribati have been relocated (Solomon Islands, notably Choiseul Province; and Vanuatu), after the Phoenix Islands Settlement Scheme or emigrated (to New Zealand and Hawaii mainly).

97% of those living in Kiribati are able to read in Gilbertese, and 80% are able to read English. It is one of the Oceanic languages. The largest individual Oceanic languages are Eastern Fijian with over 600,000 speakers, and Samoan with an estimated 400,000 speakers. The Gilbertese, Tongan, Tahitian, Māori, Western Fijian and Tolai (Gazelle Peninsula) languages each have over 100,000 speakers.

In 2020 Finlayson Park School in Auckland became the first school in New Zealand to set up a Gilbertese language unit, where Erika Taeang was employed as the teacher.

Countries by number of Gilbertese speakers 
 Kiribati, 103,000 (2010 census)
 Fiji, 6,600 (2019)
 Solomon Islands, 6,800 (2012)
 New Zealand, 2,115 (2013)
 Nauru, 1,500, then 500 cited 2011
 Tuvalu, 100 (2002)
 Vanuatu, 400
 Hawaii, 141 (2010 US census)

Linguistics and study
The Gilbertese language has two main dialects, Northern and Southern. Their main differences are in the pronunciation of some sounds. The islands of Butaritari and Makin also have their own dialect that differs from the standard Kiribati in some vocabulary and pronunciation.

Dialect listing 
 Banaban (Banaba and Rabi Island, Fiji)
 Northern Kiribati (Makin, Butaritari, Marakei, Abaiang, Tarawa, Maiana, Kuria, Abemama and Aranuka)
 Butaritari/Makin (Butaritari and Makin)
 Nuian (Tuvalu)
 Southern Kiribati (Tabiteuea, Onotoa, Nonouti, Beru, Nikunau, Tamana and Arorae)

Historical sound changes

1 Sometimes when reflecting Proto-Micronesian .2 Sometimes when reflecting Proto-Micronesian .

Phonology
Gilbertese contrasts 13 consonants and 10 vowel sounds.

Other minimal pairs include:

Grammar 
Gilbertese has a basic verb–object–subject word order (VOS).

Nouns
Any noun can be formed from a verb or an adjective by preceding it with the definite article "te".

nako (to go)
te nako (the going)
uraura (red)
te uraura (the redness)

Nouns can be marked for possession (by person and number). Plurality is only marked in some nouns by lengthening the first vowel.

te boki (book)
booki (books)

There is no marked gender. Biological gender can be marked by adding mmwaane (male) or aiine (female) to the noun. The absence of gender creates a difficulty with the words brother/sister.

te moa (chicken)
te moa mmwaane (rooster) (writing mwane is more usual)
te moa aiine (hen) (writing aine is more usual)
 tariu (my brother or my sister if he or she has the same sex of the speaker)
 maneu (my brother or my sister if he or she has a different sex of the speaker)

For human nouns, the linker 'n' may be used.

ataei (child)
ataeinimmwaane (boy)
ataeinnaiine (girl)

Agentive nouns can be created with the particle tia (singular) or taan(i) (plural).

Articles 

The article 'te' is neither definite or indefinite; it marks that the next word is a singular noun.  Often it can also be translated as "the". The plural article is optional since there are many other ways to express plurality, namely in demonstratives, numerals, etc.

The personal articles are used before personal names. The masculine form is 'te' before names beginning with <i, u, w, b', ng>, 'tem' before <b, m>, 'ten' before <a, e, o, n, r, t> and 'teng' before <k, (ng)>.

Pronouns 
Pronouns have different forms according to case: nominative (subject), accusative (object), emphatic (vocatives, adjunct pronouns), genitive (possessives).

Demonstratives 

The basic 'aei' simply means "this", 'anne" is "that", 'arei' is "that over there" and are used after the noun. 'Aikai' is "these" and so on. The masculine "teuaei" means "this man", the feminine "neiei" means "this woman", and the inanimate "te baei" means "this thing". The feminine demonstrative has no plural form, as the human plural encapsulates mixed groups.

Adverbs 

"Ngkai" is "now", "ngkanne" is "then" and "ngkekei" is "later". "Ikai" is "here", "ikanne" is "there" and "ikekei" is "over there".

Verbs 
Verbs do not conjugate according to person, number, tense, aspect or mood. These verbal categories are indicated by particles. Nonetheless,  a passive suffix -aki is used as in:

 E kabooa te raiti	He bought the rice.
 E kabooaki te raiti	The rice was bought (by him).

Any adjective can also be an intransitive verb. Transitive verbs can be formed by the circumfix ka- (...) -a creating a causative verb, e.g. "uraura" (to be red) becomes "kaurauraa" (to redden). Tense is marked by adverbs. However, the default interpretation of the unmarked (by adverbs) verb is a past tense. Below is a list of verbal particles:

 a (immediate, incompleted and indeterminate)
 tabe n(i) (progressive)
 nang(i) (prospective future)
 na (general future)
 a tib'a (immediate past)
 a tia n(i) (past perfect)

Copula verbs 
There are no verbs corresponding to English "to be", so a stative verb must be used or a zero copula strategy:

There is also a locative copula verb "mena":

Existential verb 
There is no corresponding verb to "to have", instead an existential verb meaning "there to be" is used - iai.

Reduplication 
Reduplication is used to mark aspect.

 Partial reduplication marks the habitual aspect for example "nako" (to go) and "naanako" (to usually go). 
 Full reduplication shows the continuative aspect, e.g. "koro" (to cut), "korokoro" (to continually cut). 
 Mixed: "kiba" (to jump), "kiikiba" (to usually jump), "kibakiba" (to continually jump, to be excited), "kikibakiba" (to jump on regular occasions).

Adjectives can also be formed by reduplication with the meaning of "abundant in [adj.]" - "karau" (rain), "kakarau" (rainy).

Negation 
The main negator is the particle "aki" placed after the pronoun and before the verb. The negator "aikoa" is for counterexpected situations.

Ko aki taetae: You don't speak.

Numerals 
Gilbertese uses classifiers for counting with numerals like Asian languages (Chinese, Vietnamese, etc.). These classifiers are suffixes to the numerals: -ua (general, for objects), -man (animate beings), -kai (plants, land, fish hooks), -ai (fish, elongated objects), -waa (transportation), -baa (leaves, flat objects) among many others. It is a decimal system with -bwi as a "10 counting" suffix. Zero ("akea") is just the word for 'nothing'.

Loanwords
When arriving, the translation of the Bible (te Baibara) was the first duty of the missionaries. Protestants (1860) and Roman Catholics (1888) had to find or create some words that were not in use in the Gilbert Islands, like mountain (te maunga, borrowing it from Hawaiian mauna or Samoan maunga), and like serpents, but also to find a good translation for God (te Atua). Many words were adapted from English, like te moko (smoke), te buun (spoon), te beeki (pig), te raiti (rice), te tai (time, a watch), te auti (house), te katamwa (cat, from expression cat-at-me). Some words of the Swadesh list did not exist in Gilbertese like te aiti (ice) or te tinoo (snow). But things that did not exist previously also were interpreted to form new Gilbertese words: te rebwerebwe (motorbike), te wanikiba (plane, a flying canoe), te momi (pearl, from Hawaiian).

Alphabet
The Gilbertese language is written in the Latin script, which was introduced in the 1860s when Hiram Bingham Jr, a Protestant missionary, first translated the Bible into Gilbertese. Until then, the language was unwritten. Since the independence of Kiribati in 1979, long vowels and consonants are represented by doubling the character like Dutch and Finnish. A few digraphs are used for the velar nasals and velarized bilabials. Bingham and the first Roman Catholic missionaries (1888) did not indicate in their script the vowel length by doubling the character. The discrepancies between the Protestant and Roman Catholic spellings have been an issue since 1895. For example, the word maneaba should be written mwaneaba or even mwaaneaba and the atoll of Makin, Mwaakin. The Kiribati Protestant Church has also recently used a different script for both velarized bilabials, “b’a” and “m’a”, which are found in Protestant publications.

Vocabulary

One difficulty in translating the Bible was references to words such as "mountain", a geographical phenomenon unknown to the people of the islands of Kiribati at the time, heard only in the myths from Samoa. Bingham substituted "hilly", which would be more easily understood. Such adjustments are common to all languages as "modern" things require the creation of new words or the usage of loan words.

For example, the Gilbertese word for airplane is te wanikiba, "the canoe that flies". Some words changed to translate Western words into Gilbertese. For example, te aro (species or colour) is now used in translating religion. Te kiri (the dog), found in 1888 vocabulary, is now less used than te kamea (from English, loan word).

Catholic missionaries arrived at the islands in 1888 and translated the Bible independently of Bingham, which led to differences (Bingham wrote Jesus as "Iesu", but the Catholics wrote "Ietu") that would be resolved only in the 20th century. In 1954, Father Ernest Sabatier published the larger and more accurate Kiribati to French dictionary (translated into English by Sister Olivia): Dictionnaire gilbertin–français, 981 pages (edited by South Pacific Commission in 1971). It remains the only work of importance between the Kiribati language and a Western language. It was then reversed by Frédéric Giraldi in 1995 to creating the first French-Kiribati dictionary. In addition, a grammar section was added by Father Gratien Bermond (MSC). The dictionary is available at the French National Library Rare Language Department and at the headquarters of the Missionaries of the Sacred Heart (MSC), Issoudun.

Notes

Bibliography

*

External links

English/Kiribati and Kiribati/English translator with over 50,000 words
Gilbertese words collection for SuperMemo
Kaipuleohone archive includes recordings and written materials on Kiribati
Materials on Fijian are included in the open access Arthur Capell collections (AC1 and AC2) held by Paradisec.
Additional Kiribati materials in Paradisec from Bill Palmer (BP5) and Jeff Siegel (JS2)
Dictionary with Gilbertese – English Translations from Webster's Online Dictionary – The Rosetta Edition
How to count in Gilbertese

 
Languages of Fiji
Languages of Kiribati
Languages of Nauru
Languages of the Marshall Islands
Languages of the Solomon Islands
Languages of Tuvalu
Languages of Vanuatu
Micronesian languages
Verb–object–subject languages